Fa La La may refer to:

 Fa La La, a 2011 album by Victoria Shaw
 Fa La La (album), a multi-album project by Rasputina vocalist Melora Creager
 "Fa La La", a 2011 song by Justin Bieber from Under the Mistletoe
 "Fa La La", a 2011 song by Jim Brickman
 "Fa La La", a 2008 song by The Kooks from Konk

See also 
 Solfège, a pedagogical technique for teaching sight-singing
 Refrain, the line or lines that are repeated in music or in verse